KIQQ-FM (103.7 FM) is a radio station that is licensed to Newberry Springs, California and serves the Barstow area. The station is owned by Lazer Broadcasting and broadcasts a regional Mexican music format. KIQQ-FM simulcasts on KBTW (104.5 FM) in Lenwood and KWRN (1550 AM) in Apple Valley.

The station signed on in January 2001 by Moon Broadcasting with a regional Mexican format.

The KIQQ call letters were previously held by a station at 100.3 FM in Los Angeles (now KKLQ) from 1972 to 1989, branded as "K-100". Programmed by Bill Drake, the top 40-formatted station featured noted personalities from KHJ's "Boss Radio" era, including The Real Don Steele, Robert W. Morgan, Eric Chase, and Jerry Butler.

References

External links

IQQ-FM
IQQ-FM